The Ontario–Quebec–Vermont League was a minor league baseball league that played in the 1924 season. The Class B level league directly evolved from the 1922–1923 Eastern Canada League. The 1924 Ontario–Quebec–Vermont League consisted of teams based in Canada and the United States.

History
The Eastern Canada League was a Class B level minor league that began play in 1922, with franchises based entirely in Canada. The four–team league played for two seasons. Three of the teams remained when the league evolved to become the 1924 Ontario–Quebec–Vermont League.

In 1922, the Eastern Canada League began play as a Class B league and was founded by Joseph H. Page, who also served as league president. The four–team circuit was composed of the Montreal Royals (55–69), Ottawa Senators (68–57), Trois Rivieres Trios (69–53) and Valleyfield/Cap de la Madeleine Madcaps (56–69). Valleyfield moved to Cap de la Madeleine on July 29, 1922. Montreal and Ottawa would become stable franchises and form the foundation of the Ontario–Quebec–Vermont League.

In their final season of play, the 1923 Class B level Eastern Canada League featured the Montreal Royals (66–51) Ottawa Canadiens (62–52), Quebec Bulldogs (47–62) and Trois Rivieres Trios/Montreal (52–62). In mid season 1923, Trois-Rivières moved to Montreal. Ottawa played some home games in Montreal while its own ballpark was being built. The Montreal Royals won the first–half pennant and the Ottawa Canadiens won the second–half pennant. In the playoffs, Montreal defeated Ottawa 8 games to 7.

In 1924, the Eastern Canada League expanded and added teams to become the Ontario–Quebec–Vermont League. The league was formed from the efforts of Canadian Pacific Railway sports promoter Joseph Page and retired Major League Baseball pitcher Jean Dubuc, a Vermont native. Page had founded the Eastern Canada league as well and was president of both leagues, while Dubuc became the player/manager of the Ottawa franchise. For travel, the two made efforts to structure the league with franchises based in towns having Canadian Pacific stops.

The new league began play on May 15, 1924, structured as a six–team Class B level league with franchises based in locations indicative of the league name. The Montreal, Ottawa and Quebec franchises remained and three expansion franchises were added.

The charter Ontario–Quebec–Vermont League members featured three new franchises, the Montpelier Goldfish (Vermont), Outremont Canadiens (Montreal's second team) and Rutland Sheiks (Vermont). They joined the Montreal Royals, Ottawa-Hull Senators and Quebec Bulldogs. The league played the season in two halves. The Quebec Bulldogs won both half seasons and were the champions as no playoffs were held. The final overall standings were won by Quebec Bulldogs (66–40). Quebec was followed by the Montreal Royals (54–55), Outremont Canadiens (49–58) and Ottawa-Hull Senators (46–55). The two new Vermont based franchises, the Rutland Sheiks (34–20) and Montpelier Goldfish (16–37) both folded on July 15, 1924. The four remaining Ontario–Quebec–Vermont League teams continued play after losing two franchises, but the league permanently folded after completing the season on September 3, 1924.

1924 Ontario–Quebec–Vermont League teams

1924 Ontario–Quebec–Vermont League overall standings

References

External links
 Baseball Reference

Defunct baseball leagues in Canada
Defunct minor baseball leagues in the United States
Baseball leagues in Vermont
Defunct professional sports leagues in the United States
Sports leagues established in 1924
Sports leagues disestablished in 1924